Macrolobium amplexans is a species of plant in the family Fabaceae. It is found in Suriname.

References

Detarioideae
Flora of Suriname
Vulnerable plants
Taxonomy articles created by Polbot